Xitole is a sector in the Bafata Region of Guinea-Bissau. It covers an area of 1,218.6 square kilometres, and with a population of 19,424.

References

Bafatá Region
Sectors of Guinea-Bissau
Populated places in Guinea-Bissau